Omar Killed Me is a 2011 drama film directed by Roschdy Zem. The film was selected as the Moroccan entry for the Best Foreign Language Film at the 84th Academy Awards. On 18 January 2012, the film was named as one of the nine shortlisted entries for the Oscars. Zem, Olivier Gorce, Rachid Bouchareb and Olivier Lorelle were collectively nominated for the César Award for Best Adaptation and Sami Bouajila was nominated for the César Award for Best Actor.

Plot
The film tells of the events that began in the summer of 1991 when wealthy heiress, Ghislaine Marchal, was found murdered in the basement of her home with the message "Omar M'a Tuer" (grammatically incorrect French, approximately "Omar has kill me") written beside in her own blood.  Despite a lack of forensic or DNA evidence, her Moroccan gardener, Omar Raddad, was immediately charged, found guilty and sentenced to 18 years in a French prison. Shocked by the case and convinced of his innocence, journalist Pierre-Emmanuel Vaugrenard moved to Nice to investigate.

Cast
 Sami Bouajila as Omar Raddad
 Denis Podalydès as Pierre-Emmanuel Vaugrenard
 Maurice Bénichou as Jacques Vergès
 Salomé Stévenin as Maud
 Nozha Khouadra as Latifa Raddad
 Pascal Elso as André de Comminges
 Afida Tahri as La mère de Latifa
 Yanis Abdellaoui as Karim enfant
 Ayoub El Mahlili as Karim jeune garçon
 Martial Rivol as Président Djian
 Lounès Tazairt as M. Sheriff (as Lounès Tazaïrt)

See also
 Omar Raddad Affair
 List of submissions to the 84th Academy Awards for Best Foreign Language Film
 List of Moroccan submissions for the Academy Award for Best Foreign Language Film

References

External links
 

2011 films
French drama films
2010s French-language films
2010s Arabic-language films
2011 drama films
Films directed by Roschdy Zem
Films based on non-fiction books
Moroccan drama films
2011 multilingual films
French multilingual films
Moroccan multilingual films
2010s French films